Luis Gerardo Rivera Marín is an attorney-at-law and notary and a  former secretary of state of Puerto Rico. Prior to this designation, Rivera Marín served as executive director of the Puerto Rico Tourism Company and as the secretary of consumer affairs of Puerto Rico. He had to resign to his position as Secretary of State (July 13, 2019), taking effect on July 31, 2019.

Biography
Rivera Marín graduated from the Colegio San Ignacio de Loyola and from the Colegio Maristas. While at Maristas, he was a classmate and friend of Luis Fortuño who would later become governor of Puerto Rico.

After graduating from high school, he pursued several degrees. He first obtained a bachelor's degree in economics from the University of Massachusetts Amherst and then pursued graduate studies, obtaining a master's degree in international business from the NYU Stern School of Business and a juris doctor from the University of Puerto Rico School of Law.

Upon finishing his academic studies, Rivera Marín set up his own law firm. While at his law firm, he worked pro bono in favor of Dominicans residing in Puerto Rico, particularly with immigration issues.

But after several years of private practice he became a public servant after his high school friend, Luis Fortuño, who was by now governor of Puerto Rico, asked him to join his cabinet. He was first appointed as Secretary of Consumer Affairs of Puerto Rico In that period, he managed to ensure that American Express credit card users (who had been harmed in the company´s practices, which included charging higher interest rates, and providing less debt forgiveness, among other offenses), in Puerto Rico , the US Virgin Islands and other US territories, received full remediation. During the Office review under his command, American Express provided monetary and non-monetary relief to 221,932 disadvantaged consumers, resulting in approximately $ 95 million, and a few years after was concurrently appointed as executive director of the Puerto Rico Tourism Company, overseeing a budget of $100 million USD.

After Fortuño was defeated in the 2012 general election, Rivera Marín returned to his private life. During that time, he also appeared as an analyst on political shows in radio and television on the island.

Then, in 2016, after Ricardo Rosselló was elected governor, Rivera Marín was appointed as Secretary of State of Puerto Rico. During his tenure as Secretary of State, he led with great strength, the difficulties of the Island, such as Hurricane Maria *2 in 2017, as well as in previous weeks, the rescue and care of the American citizens of the nearby islands when the Hurricane Irma *3. Likewise, he carried out a recognized work in international politics with the insertion of Puerto Rico in the world. 

On July 16, 2019, he changed his end date from July 30 to that day amidst the Telegramgate scandal involving the governor of Puerto Rico and his closest officials. His immediate successor Pedro Pierluisi was nominated by the governor before his own resignation and immediately sworn in as acting Secretary of State on July 31, 2019 and potential successor to the governorship, but ultimately was not approved by the Puerto Rican Congress. This eventually made María Marcano de León his acting successor again and made Justice Secretary Wanda Vázquez Garced the new governor.

Personal life
Rivera Marín is married to Margarita, a licensed architect, with whom he has two daughters, Carmen Margarita and Ana.

References

External links

Colegio San Ignacio de Loyola alumni
Living people
Members of the 17th Cabinet of Puerto Rico
New York University alumni
Secretaries of Consumer Affairs of Puerto Rico
Secretaries of State of Puerto Rico
University of Massachusetts Amherst College of Social and Behavioral Sciences alumni
University of Puerto Rico alumni
Year of birth missing (living people)